Atithi Devo Bhava, also spelt Atithidevo Bhava, English translation: A guest is akin to God, prescribes a dynamic of the host-guest relationship, which embodies the traditional Indian Hindu-Buddhist philosophy of revering guests with the same respect as a god. This concept of going out of the way to treat guests with reverence goes even beyond the traditional Hindu-Buddhist common greeting of namaste (I bow to the divinity in you) used for everyone.

The mantras are from the Taittiriya Upanishad, Shikshavalli I.11.2, which says: matrudevo bhava, mitradevo bhava, pitrudevo bhava, putradevo bhava, acharyadevo bhava, atithidevo bhava. It literally means "be one for whom the Mother is God, be one for whom the Friend is God, be one for whom the Father is God, be one for whom the Child is God, be one for whom the Teacher is God, and be one for whom the Guest is God". Matrudevah, mitradevah, pitrudevah, putradevah, acharyadevah, and atithidevah are one word each, and each one is a Bahuvrihi samasta-pada.

Ritual or Puja 
In Hinduism/Sanatana Dharma personal God is worshipped in five-step worship; this is known as Panchopchara Puja. The "Shodashopchar Poojan" is more elaborate and formal, and involves 16 steps.

The five steps from the worship become the five formalities to be observed while receiving guests:
 Fragrance (Dhupa) – While receiving guests, the rooms must have a pleasant fragrance because this is the first thing that attracts or detracts guests from their visit. A pleasant fragrance will put a guest in good humour.
 Lamp (Dipa) – Prior to the electrification of India, a lamp was put between host and guest, so that expression and body language would remain clearly visible, and therefore no gap would be created between host and guest.
 Eatables (Naivedya) – Fruits and sweets made of milk were offered to guests.
 Rice (Akshata) – It is a symbol of being undivided. A tilak, often made of a vermilion paste, is put on the forehead, and rice grains are placed on it. This is the highest form of welcome in Hindu Indian families.
 Flower offering (Pushpa) – A flower is a gesture of goodwill. When the guest departs, the flower symbolizes the sweet memories of the visit, which stay with them for several days.

Campaign by the Government of India 
India attracts millions of tourists each year. To further enhance the number of tourists traveling to India, the Tourism Department of India started the Atithi Devo Bhava campaign with the theme Incredible India.

"Atithi Devo Bhava" is a social awareness campaign that aims at providing the inbound tourist a greater sense of being welcomed to the country. The campaign targets the general public, while focusing mainly on the stakeholders of the tourism industry. The campaign provides training and orientation to taxi driver, guides, immigration officers, police, and other personnel who interact directly with the tourist.

See also 
Culture of India
Hospitality
 Incredible India
Puja (Hinduism)
 Stranded in India

References 

Indian hospitality
Tourism in India
Ministry of Tourism (India)
Sanskrit words and phrases
Hindu practices